United Center is an indoor arena on the Near West Side of Chicago, Illinois, United States. It is home to the Chicago Bulls of the National Basketball Association (NBA) and the Chicago Blackhawks of the National Hockey League (NHL). It is named after its corporate sponsor United Airlines, which has been based in Chicago since 2007. With a capacity of nearly 21,000, the United Center is the largest arena by capacity in the NBA, and second largest arena by capacity in the NHL. It also has a seating capacity of 23,500 for concerts.

Opening in 1994, the United Center replaced the Chicago Stadium, which was located across the street. The first event held at the arena was WWF SummerSlam. Due to the lockout, the Blackhawks did not move in until January 1995. In 1996, the United Center hosted the Democratic National Convention, where it first introduced a new style four-screen speech prompting system for speakers consisting of two glass teleprompters, accompanied by an inset lectern monitor, and for the first time, a large under-camera confidence monitor.

The arena is home to an iconic statue of Michael Jordan built in 1994. Originally located outside the arena, it now stands inside an atrium which was added in 2017. The statue has since been joined by statues of Blackhawks legends Bobby Hull and Stan Mikita, while a statue of various Blackhawks players is located across the street on the site of Chicago Stadium.

On March 25, 2021, the United Center became Chicago's logistical hub to support the city's efforts against COVID-19.

Arena information
The Bulls and Blackhawks own and operate United Center through the United Center Joint Venture (UCJV), a 50/50 partnership. The arena is the largest in the United States in size, though not in capacity. Its exterior bears a striking resemblance to that of Chicago Stadium. It seats 19,717 for hockey, 20,917 for basketball and up to 23,500 for concerts. The United Center hosts over 200 events per year and has drawn over 20 million visitors since its opening. Attendance routinely exceeds seating capacity for Bulls and Blackhawks games.

United Center's acoustics were designed to amplify noise to replicate "The Roar" – the din that made Chicago Stadium famous, especially during hockey games.  During hockey season, the Blackhawks use an Allen Organ that is a replica of the old arena's famous Barton organ. Recreating the old organ's notes took two years.

While the Blackhawks and Bulls had long planned another arena, an inflated real estate market and the early 1990s recession delayed the project until financing was secured from an international syndicate, with funding by banks from Japan, Australia and France. Originally having 216 luxury sky-boxes, as of the 2009–10 renovation the arena has 169 executive suites on three levels.

Both the Chicago Blackhawks and the Chicago Bulls play their home games at the arena with some of them on back to back nights. The hardwood floor for the Bulls games is laid over the ice that the Blackhawks play on. The flooring is assembled like a puzzle and taken apart when the Blackhawks have a game. The Chicago Bulls operate their practice facility, the Advocate Center, named after the Advocate Medical Group, a block just to the east of the United Center. That facility opened in 2014.

Events

Sports

Basketball
The Bulls won the 1996 and 1997 series in the sixth game at home, but won the 1998 series at the Delta Center, now known as Vivint Arena, in Salt Lake City, Utah.

In 2020, it hosted the NBA All-Star Game.

Hockey
The Blackhawks won the first two Stanley Cups on the ice of their opponent in the sixth game of the series (Philadelphia's Wachovia Center in 2010 and Boston's TD Garden in 2013). However, they won the 2015 series against the Tampa Bay Lightning at home in the sixth game, the first time since 1938 the Hawks clinched the Cup in Chicago.

The Illinois State High School Hockey Championships are hosted at the United Center yearly for the Blackhawk Cup.

NCAA basketball
In addition to 41 Bulls and Blackhawks games each year, United Center has hosted other sporting events such as University of Illinois basketball, the Big Ten men's basketball tournament (from the first tournament in 1998 to 2001, then in odd-numbered years from 2003 to 2007 and again in 2013 and 2015), the Men's NCAA basketball tournament (hosted six times, including 2022), the Roundball Classic, and the Great Eight Classic.

Professional wrestling
United Center was also the site of the World Wrestling Federation pay-per-view SummerSlam in 1994—the first major event held inside the building, and also the only major event held in the building by WWE, as they have traditionally held their Chicago events at Allstate Arena. It also hosted the last of WCW's annual Spring Stampede pay-per-view in 2000. On March 3, 2018, WWE returned to United Center for the first time in over 20 years with a "Road to WrestleMania" house show.

During a special episode of AEW Dynamite, titled Fight For the Fallen on July 28, 2021, Tony Schiavone announced that All Elite Wrestling (AEW) would host the second episode of their television series, AEW Rampage, at the United Center on August 20, 2021, subtitled "The First Dance" in what would be the first televised wrestling event to take place in the United Center since 2000. The event marked Chicago native CM Punk's AEW debut and return to professional wrestling. AEW also held another event at the United Center in partnership with New Japan Pro-Wrestling (NJPW) on June 26, 2022, titled AEW×NJPW: Forbidden Door.

Mixed martial arts
On January 28, 2012, the Ultimate Fighting Championship held its first nationally televised event at the arena: UFC on Fox. UFC on Fox 2 was the UFC's 2nd live prime-time event on Fox. The headlining fight was former UFC Light-Heavyweight Champion Rashad Evans vs. Phil Davis, with Evans winning by unanimous decision. The UFC announced in mid-January 2015 that the United Center would be host of UFC on Fox 16. The United Center also hosted UFC on Fox: Johnson vs. Dodson in 2013 and UFC on Fox: Henderson vs. Thomson in 2014.

On June 9, 2018, United Center hosted UFC 225 which was its first PPV event.

On June 8, 2019, United Center hosted UFC 238 which was one day before last year's UFC 225.

Bull riding
On the weekend of March 5–6, 2011, the Professional Bull Riders made their Built Ford Tough Series debut at the United Center. It was their third Chicago-area visit, having previously visited Rosemont's Allstate Arena in 2006 and 2008. The event at the United Center presented a unique scenario as instead of dirt, white crushed stone was used to cover the arena floor.

Tennis
In September 2018, the United Center hosted the second edition of the Laver Cup. The tennis competition will feature Team Europe vs. Team World.

Gymnastics
On October 13, 2016, the arena hosted the Kellogg's Tour of Gymnastics Champions.

Entertainment 

Concerts
With a seating capacity of 23,500 for concerts, United Center has been a home to many concert performances. The first was Billy Joel, who stated the “...acoustics could use some work..” New Kids on the Block, Guns N' Roses, Prince, Adele, The Smashing Pumpkins, Taylor Swift, Madonna, U2, Rolling Stones, Tina Turner, Van Halen, Iron Maiden, Aerosmith, KISS, Bon Jovi, Barbra Streisand, Bruce Springsteen, Sir Paul McCartney, Janet Jackson, BLACKPINK, Celine Dion, Shakira, Coldplay,  BTS, The Who, Pearl Jam, Green Day, Jay-Z, Mary J. Blige, Ariana Grande, Lady Gaga, and Dua Lipa have all had sold-out shows for their concerts in this arena, as well as Dave Matthews Band, who released its 1998 show at the venue, entitled Live in Chicago 12.19.98 at the United Center. Contemporary Christian music has also been played at this venue, on tours such as the Tomlin UNITED tour in June 2022, featuring Hilllsong UNITED, Chris Tomlin, and Pat Barrett.

Family events
United Center has also provided a Chicago home for the Ringling Bros. and Barnum & Bailey Circus (last performance was 2016, and they permanently shut down on May 21, 2017) and Disney on Ice, which occur once per year; the Bulls and Blackhawks have a tradition of taking a two-week road trip when the circus is in town. After Ringling left Chicago for one final time in November 2016, the Bulls and Blackhawks allowed Ringling's sister production Disney on Ice to perform its last two-week show in February 2017, before being condensed to a one-week period effective February 2018.

Television events
On August 29, 1994, the newly opened United Center was home to the seventh annual WWF Summerslam Pay-Per-View event. Aired Live, attendance was at 23,000.

On May 17, 2011, Oprah The Farewell Season: Oprah's Surprise Spectacular was taped at the United Center. The program aired on television on May 23 and 24, 2011. Pictures from the event are displayed inside the arena entrance on the wall of Gate 4.

Political events
United Center was also the venue of the 1996 Democratic National Convention, where the Democratic Party nominated as its presidential and vice-presidential candidates Bill Clinton and Al Gore, the incumbent holders of the respective offices, who would be re-elected as a result of the general election held that November.

Renovations

300 Level
New for the 2009–10 season, United Center's 300 Level features a renovated concourse with 144 flat screen televisions, new food and beverage stations above select seating sections and two new bars that open up to panoramic views of the arena. During the 2010 off-season, two additional bars with panoramic views of the arena were added along with the other two. After the 2012–13 season, a third panoramic LED bar was installed around the 300 level, replacing the famous "Welcome To The Madhouse" signs.

United Center includes:
A variety of new menu items provided by the United Center's new food and beverage provider, Levy Restaurants.
A new concession stand and seating area located in Section 326 called “Backstage. ”This area replicates the atmosphere of being backstage at a United Center concert and will include photos of music acts that played at the United Center along with a specialized menu from Levy Restaurants.
New concession stands and bars located at the top of the 300 Level on the north side of the arena to provide fans sitting in that area with easy access to food and beverage service.
Two new novelty areas carrying merchandise unique to "The Madhouse on Madison".
New concourse food stations with increased seating.
New video systems featuring photography, video and animation on the concourse walls which will create images and specialized programming for each individual event.

Hardwood floor 
A new court was added to the UC for the 2015–16 season and includes multiple changes. The iconic bull head logo at center court has increased in size by 75% and the image of a basketball that was previously behind the logo has been removed. The “CHICAGO BULLS” text on the endlines has been changed to the font used in the official Bulls logo to make the court design more consistent with the Bulls brand, and the same font has been applied to the “Bulls.com” and the “@ChicagoBulls” text on the north apron of the court. The lines on the court have been changed from red and white to all black to emphasize the bold colors of the Bulls brand. The four stars from the City of Chicago flag have been added to the south apron of the court to highlight the team's civic pride and incorporate the “Chicago Basketball” branding campaign.

Scoreboard 

In 2019, a new scoreboard manufactured by Mitsubishi Electric was added to United Center. At its unveiling, the scoreboard was the largest and highest-resolution scoreboard in any dual-purpose NHL/NBA arena. The scoreboard has a  display with 4 mm pixel spacing, six independent moving panels, and a continuous inner ring display. New audio and lighting systems were installed alongside the scoreboard upgrade.

Sportsbook Lounge 
On February 1, 2022, the United Center and FanDuel Group announced a partnership to develop a sportsbook lounge located next to the United Center atrium. The two story venue will be built out as a non-wagering space complete with FanDuel branding with screens featuring other live sports events. The plan is contingent on approval from The Illinois Gaming Board.

Banners

The following banners hang from the rafters of United Center honoring past and present Bulls and Blackhawks.

Bulls

Championship banners
 1974–75 Midwest Division Champions
 1990–91, 1991–92, 1992–93, 1995–96*, 1996–97, 1997–98, 2010–11, 2011–12 Central Division Champions
 1990–91, 1991–92, 1992–93, 1995–96, 1996–97, 1997–98 Eastern Conference Champions
 1991, 1992, 1993, 1996, 1997, 1998 NBA World Champions
 A banner with the number 72 is hung below the 1995–96 division title to denote the Bulls' then-record 72–10 season.

Blackhawks

Championship banners
 1990–91, 2012–13* Presidents' Trophy Champions
 1966-67 Prince of Wales Trophy Champions
 1969–70 Wales Conference Champions
 1970–71, 1971–72, 1972–73 1991-92 Campbell Conference Champions
 2009–10, 2012–13, 2014–15 Western Conference Champions
 1975–76, 1977–78, 1978–79, 1979–80 Smythe Division Champions
 1982–83, 1985–86, 1989–90, 1990–91, 1992–93 Norris Division Champions
 2009–10, 2012–13, 2016–2017 Central Division Champions
 1934, 1938, 1961, 2010, 2013, 2015 Stanley Cup Champions
 The banner with the years 2012–13 is hung below the 1990–91 Presidents' Trophy banner, marking the second time the Blackhawks have won the trophy.

Statues

Several statues of Bulls and Blackhawks greats exist inside and around the outside of the arena.

The most well known of these is the statue of Michael Jordan, also known as "The Spirit", on the east side of the arena in an atrium (opened in 2017) outside Gate Four. Originally installed in 1994, during Jordan's first retirement and just after the arena's opening, the statue features Jordan mid-dunk over an opposing player, with his tenures with the Bulls and career stats engraved on the bottom. The statue was initially located directly in front of the arena.

In 2000, in honor of the team's 75th anniversary, a statue of various Blackhawks greats from different eras, along with the franchise's Indian head logo, was erected on the north side of the stadium across Madison Street, near the former Chicago Stadium site. The back of the statue features the names of all Blackhawks players up to that point, along with a marble plaque commemorating Chicago Stadium. In October 2020, the statue was vandalized in protest of the team's use of Native American iconography as a logo and was temporarily removed for repairs.

Blackhawks legends Bobby Hull and Stan Mikita received bronze statues in their honor outside of the United Center during the 2011–12 NHL season.

In 2011, a bronze bust of Bulls great Scottie Pippen was dedicated in the stadium's first floor concourse.

Sponsorship

United Airlines paid about $1.8 million per year until 2014 for its naming rights. United merged with Continental Airlines in October 2010, retaining Continental's logo and corporate look. The arena continued to use United's tulip logo for the duration of the 2010–11 season. For the 2011–12 season, all the previous United signs were replaced with the globe logo. Two new lit signs on the east and west ends of the arena saying "United Center" with the United globe in the middle were revealed below the upper level suites complementing the former "Madhouse" signs on the north and south sides.

In December 2013, it was announced that an agreement had been reached to keep United's naming rights for the arena for another 20 years. The United Center will see a series of updates and upgrades to the interior and exterior of the building. New signage, additional LED boards, and other elements have been added after reaching this agreement. LED screens have been installed on the north side of the arena along with a panoramic LED board on the 300 level, eliminating the "Welcome To The Madhouse" sign.

Anheuser-Busch has also established a sponsorship. They are partners with both the Chicago Bulls and Chicago Blackhawks and have gained rights to signage inside the arena along with a pub.

Seating capacity

Record attendance
Basketball: 24,544 (11 times during the 1996 NBA Playoffs and 1997 NBA Playoffs)
Ice hockey: 22,712, December 26, 2008, vs. Philadelphia Flyers.
Professional wrestling: 23,300, August 29, 1994, at SummerSlam (1994).

See also
List of indoor arenas in the United States

References

External links

Basketball venues in Chicago
Buildings and structures in Chicago
Chicago Bulls venues
College basketball venues in the United States
Gymnastics venues in Chicago
Indoor ice hockey venues in Chicago
Mixed martial arts venues in Illinois
Music venues in Chicago
National Basketball Association venues
National Hockey League venues
Tennis venues in Chicago
Wrestling venues in Chicago
Sports venues in Chicago
Sports venues completed in 1994
Tourist attractions in Chicago
United Airlines
1994 establishments in Illinois
Wrestling venues in Illinois
Chicago Blackhawks